Alexander R. Ottiano (born February 4, 1976) is a male judoka from the United States, who twice won the bronze medal in the men's half lightweight division (– 66 kg) at the Pan American Games (1999 and 2003). He represented his native country in two consecutive Summer Olympics, starting in 2000.

References
 

1976 births
Living people
American male judoka
Judoka at the 2000 Summer Olympics
Judoka at the 2004 Summer Olympics
Judoka at the 1999 Pan American Games
Judoka at the 2003 Pan American Games
Olympic judoka of the United States
Sportspeople from Providence, Rhode Island
Pan American Games bronze medalists for the United States
Pan American Games medalists in judo
Medalists at the 1999 Pan American Games
Medalists at the 2003 Pan American Games
20th-century American people
21st-century American people